Juan (de) Maldonado may refer to:

  (1485–1554), Spanish humanist and writer of a.o. Somnium
 Juan Maldonado (fl. 1536–1572, captain in the army of Gonzalo Jiménez de Quesada involved in the Spanish conquest of the Muisca, co-founder of Simití, Bolívar; see List of conquistadors in Colombia
 Juan de Maldonado (governor of Cartagena), Spanish governor of Cartagena, 1554–1555; see List of governors of the Province of Cartagena
 Juan Maldonado (conquistador, born 1525) (1525–1572), Spanish conquistador in Venezuela and Colombia, founder of San Cristóbal, Venezuela
 Juan Maldonado (Jesuit) (1533–1583), Spanish Jesuit
 Juan Villanueva Maldonado, 16th-century Spanish conquistador and founder of Macas, Ecuador
 Juan Álvarez Maldonado, 16th-century Spanish conquistador of Peru, who wrote about Paititi 
 Juan Pacheco Maldonado, 16th-century Spanish explorer of Morong, Rizal and Maynila, Philippines
 Juan Maldonado de Villasante, 17th-century Spanish governor of Costa Rica
 Juan Manuel Maldonado, 19th-century Mexican colonel involved in the foundation of Piedras Negras, Coahuila
 Tetabiate (Juan Maldonado Waswechia Beltran, 1857–1901), Mexican indigenous leader of the Yaqui resistance
 Félix Maldonado (Felix Juan Maldonado, 1938–2010), Puerto Rican baseball manager
 Juan L. Maldonado (born 1948), president of Laredo Community College, Texas
 Juan Mayr (Juan Mayr Maldonado, born 1952), photographer and ambassador of Colombia to Germany
 Juan Maldonado Jaimez (born 1982), Brazilian footballer
 Juan Maldonado (footballer, born 1986), Argentinian footballer
 Juan Maldonado (footballer, born 1990), Paraguayan footballer
 Estadio Juan Maldonado Gamarra, football stadium in Peru

See also 
 Juana de la Concepción (Juana de Maldonado y Paz, 1598–1566), Guatemalan nun and poet